This is a list of rivers that are at least partially in Kyrgyzstan. The rivers are grouped by drainage basin. Rivers flowing into other rivers are listed by the rivers they flow into. Some rivers (e.g. Syr Darya) do not flow through Kyrgyzstan themselves, but they are mentioned for having Kyrgyz tributaries. They are given in italics. For clarity, only rivers with a drainage basin area over 1,000 km2 are shown. For an alphabetical overview of rivers of Kyrgyzstan, see the category Rivers of Kyrgyzstan. In total, there are 2044 rivers with a length of more than 10 km in Kyrgyzstan with a total length of about 35000 km.

Syr Darya basin

The Syr Darya drains a large part of Kyrgyzstan through its source rivers Naryn and Kara Darya, and a number of tributaries in the Ferghana Valley. It discharges into the North Aral Sea.

Syr Darya
Chirchiq
Chatkal
Chandalash
Ak-Suu
Kozu-Baglan
Isfara
Sokh
Kojo-Ashkan
Kasansay
Shohimardonsoy/Shaymerden
Isfayramsay
Naryn
Kara-Suu (right)
Kara-Suu (left)
Uzun-Akmat
Chychkan
Kökömeren
Jumgal
Suusamyr
Batysh Karakol
Kökirim
Ala-Buga
Bychan
At-Bashy
Kara-Koyun
Kajyrty
On-Archa
Chong Naryn
Kichi Naryn
Kara Darya
Aravansay
Kara-Üngkür/Tentek-Say
Ak-Buura
Kögart
Kurshab
Jazy
Tar
Kara-Kulja

Talas basin

The Talas drains the Talas Region in northwestern Kyrgyzstan, and disappears into the Muyunkum Desert in Kazakhstan.

Talas
Ürmaral
Üchkoshoy
Karakol

Chu basin

The Chu (Kyrgyz: Chüy) drains part of northern Kyrgyzstan, and disappears into the Betpak-Dala Desert in Kazakhstan.

Chu
Kuragaty
Aspara/Ashmara
Chong-Kemin
Joon-Aryk
Kara-Kujur
Kochkor

Ili basin

A small area in northeastern Kyrgyzstan is drained by the Karkyra towards the Ili, which discharges into Lake Balkash.

Ili
Charyn
Karkyra

Tarim basin

The southeastern part of Kyrgyzstan and the eastern Alay Valley are drained by tributaries of the Tarim, which disappears in the Tarim Basin.

Tarim
Aksu/Saryjaz
Toshkan/Kakshaal/Aksay
Üzönggükuush
Kök-Kyya
Müdürüm
Terek
Ak-Shyyrak
Üchköl
Engilchek
Kashgar
Eastern Kyzyl-Suu

Amu Darya basin

The western Alay Valley is drained by the Kyzyl-Suu towards the Amu Darya, which discharges into the South Aral Sea.

Amu Darya
Vakhsh/Kyzyl-Suu
Kök-Suu

Issyk-Kul basin

Much of northeastern Kyrgyzstan is drained by several rivers towards the endorheic lake Issyk-Kul.

Tüp
Jyrgalang

References

Kyrgyzstan
Rivers